Edward S. Steitz (November 7, 1920 – May 21, 1990) was an American basketball coach and official, working for the National Collegiate Athletic Association (NCAA). He was considered the leading worldwide authority on amateur basketball rules.

Early life
Born in Brooklyn, New York, Steitz was a lived in Beacon, New York.  He was a graduate of Cornell University before earning master's and doctoral degrees at Springfield College. After receiving his PhD, he started teaching at Springield in 1948.

Career

Coach and athletic director
Steitz became men's basketball coach at Springfield College from 1956 to 1966 and then became director of athletics from 1966 to 1990.

NCAA
He worked for the NCAA Men's Basketball Rules Committee as a secretary, editor and national interpreter from 1965 to 1990. He was involved in most of college basketball's major changes over the years, most notably the advent of the 45-second shot clock in 1986 and the introduction of the 3-point field goal in 1987.  He was also a longtime member of the NCAA executive committee.

International basketball
In 1974 he founded and served as a president for Amateur Basketball Association of the United States of America (ABAUSA), now USA Basketball. He was a member of the Technical Commission of FIBA. He was also a member of the United States Olympic Committee's executive committee.

Honors and awards
He was enshrined in the Naismith Memorial Basketball Hall of Fame in 1984. In 2007, he was enshrined as a contributor in the FIBA Hall of Fame.

Edward S. Steitz Award
USA Basketball's Edward S. Steitz Award was created posthumously in 1991 to recognize an individual for her or his valuable contributions to international basketball.

References

External links
 
 FIBA Hall of Fame page on Steitz

1920 births
1990 deaths
American men's basketball coaches
Basketball coaches from New York (state)
Cornell University alumni
FIBA Hall of Fame inductees
Naismith Memorial Basketball Hall of Fame inductees
National Collegiate Basketball Hall of Fame inductees
People from Beacon, New York
Sportspeople from Brooklyn
Springfield College (Massachusetts) alumni
Springfield Pride athletic directors
Springfield Pride men's basketball coaches